Sukhiye Gai is a rural locality (a selo) and the administrative center of Sukhogayovskoye Rural Settlement, Verkhnekhavsky District, Voronezh Oblast, Russia. The population was 381 as of 2010. There are 8 streets.

Geography 
Sukhiye Gai is located 11 km southwest of Verkhnyaya Khava (the district's administrative centre) by road. Dmitro-Pokrovskoye is the nearest rural locality.

References 

Rural localities in Verkhnekhavsky District